Rob Mazurek (born 1965) is an American composer, cornetist, improviser and visual artist living in Chicago, Illinois.

Biography
Rob Mazurek is an American electro-acoustic composer, cornetist, improviser and visual artist living in Chicago, Illinois.

Mazurek was born in 1965 in Jersey City, New Jersey, and played trumpet and cornet in high school in Naperville, Illinois. He first learned the foundations of improvised music while studying jazz theory and practice with David Bloom at the Bloom School of Jazz in Chicago, eventually working with other Chicago musicians like Kenny Prince, Robert Barry, Jodie Christian, Lin Halliday and Earma Thompson.

In 1996, Mazurek formed the longstanding Chicago Underground Collective with guitarist Jeff Parker and drummer Chad Taylor, a unit that ranges in size from duo to orchestra. The Collective earned Mazurek the attention of Chicago's underground community at the beginning of the 21st century, resulting in high-profile collaborations with other genre-defying artists like Gastr Del Sol, Jim O'Rourke, Sam Prekop, Stereolab and Tortoise. Isotope 217 (started by Jeff Parker) was consequently born from these endeavors.

While living in Brazil from 2000 to 2005, Mazurek constructed exotic soundscapes from the sounds of the Amazonian rain forest, including electric eels recorded at INPA research laboratory in Manaus and audio culled from storm systems on the outskirts of Brasilia. It was in São Paulo that Mazurek met Mauricio Takara and Guilherme Granado, his partners in the São Paulo Underground, a group dedicated to exploring and expanding upon Brazilian musical traditions.

Originally inspired by a joint commission from the Chicago Cultural Center and Jazz Institute of Chicago, Mazurek founded the Exploding Star Orchestra in 2005 to investigate Chicago's avant-garde musical traditions. The Orchestra has premiered a number of extended suites since its inception, including "Sting Ray and the Beginning of Time," "Cosmic Tomes for Sleepwalking Lovers," "Constellations for Inner Light Projections for Bill Dixon," "Stars Have Shapes," "63 Moons of Jupiter", "Transgressions Suite" and "Galactic Parables."

Mazurek currently leads a number of ensembles, including Exploding Star Orchestra, Pharaoh and the Underground (featuring Pharoah Sanders), Chicago Underground, Pulsar Quartet, São Paulo Underground, Skull Sessions, Sound Is Quintet, Starlicker, Mandarin Movie, and Throne of the House of Good and Evil, each of which possesses its own distinct musical personality. He has collaborated with a wide variety of artists, such as Bill Dixon, Pharoah Sanders, Mike Ladd, Roscoe Mitchell, Yusef Lateef, Fred Anderson, Naná Vasconcelos, Mamelo Sound System, Alexandre Kassin, Marcelo Camelo, and others.

As a composer, Mazurek has written over 300 original compositions over the past 30 years, and has released at least 55 recordings on various labels including Aesthetics, Cuneiform, Delmark, Family Vineyard, Mego, Northern Spy, Submarine, Thrill Jockey, and his own label Infinity Dogs. Beyond his ensemble efforts, Mazurek's solo endeavors reflect his interest in musique concrete and electronic sound manipulation, with releases on Aesthetics, Bottrop-Boy, Delmark, Mego and Moikai that document his cornet playing augmented by computer programming, electronic effects and keyboards.

Mazurek has also been awarded a number of commissions and awards. In 2016, he received a grant from the Graham Foundation for Advanced Studies in the Fine Arts for an experimental film titled "The Farnsworth Scores" in collaboration with filmmaker Lee Anne Schmitt, which was shot at Mies van der Rohe's iconic Farnsworth House.  In 2013, he was commissioned to compose the "Galactic Parables" suite by the Sant'Anna Arresi Jazz Festival in Sant'Anna Arresi, Sardinia, Italy. In 2011, he was commissioned to compose "Violent Orchid Suite" by the Jazz & Wine Festival in Cormons, Italy, and "Transgressions Suite", also by the Sant'Anna Arresi Jazz Festival. In 2010, he received the Commissioning Music/USA grant from Meet the Composer for a multi-media work developed in collaboration with video artist/choreographer Marianne Kim.

Additionally, Mazurek works as a visual artist (incorporating sound, painting and video) with numerous international performances, exhibitions and artist residencies. He has shown his multi-media works at locations throughout the United States and Europe, including the Rothko Chapel in Houston, Texas, where his paintings hang on the office walls. His pieces have also appeared at Marfa Book Company (Marfa, Texas), Galleria Coletivo (São Paulo, Brazil), Abbey Royal de Fontevraud (Fontevraud-l'Abbaye, Anjou, France), Gantner Multi-Media Center (Bourogne, France), Heaven Gallery (Chicago, Illinois, USA), Naked Duck Gallery (New York, New York, USA), Le Grande Fabrique (Dieppe, France) and URDLA Centre Estampe et Livre (Villeurbanne, France).

Discography

 as Chicago Underground
 1998 Chicago Underground Duo 12 Degrees of Freedom (Thrill Jockey)
 1998 Chicago Underground Orchestra Playground (Delmark)
 1999 Chicago Underground Trio Possible Cube (Delmark)
 2000 Chicago Underground Trio Flamethrower (Delmark)
 2000 Chicago Underground Duo Synesthesia (Thrill Jockey)
 2001 Chicago Underground Quartet Chicago Underground Quartet (Thrill Jockey)
 2002 Chicago Underground Duo Axis and Alignment  (Thrill Jockey)
 2004 Chicago Underground Trio Slon (Thrill Jockey)
 2006 Chicago Underground Duo In Praise of Shadows (Thrill Jockey)
 2007 Chicago Underground Trio Chronicle (Delmark)
 2010 Chicago Underground Duo: Boca Negra (Thrill Jockey)
 2012 Chicago Underground Duo Age of Energy (Northern Spy)
 2014 Pharaoh and the Underground (Chicago and São Paulo Underground with Pharoah Sanders) Primative Jupiter (Clean Feed)
 2014 Pharaoh and the Underground (Chicago and São Paulo Underground with Pharoah Sanders) Spiral Mercury (Clean Feed)
 2014 Chicago Underground Duo Locus (Northern Spy)
 2017 Chicago London Underground, A Night Walking Through Mirrors (Cuneiform Records)
 2020 Chicago Underground Quartet Good Days (Astral Spirits Records)

 as Sao Paulo Underground
 2006 Sao Paulo Underground Sauna: Um, Dois, Tres (Aesthetics)
 2008 Sao Paulo Underground The Principle of Intrusive Relationships (Aesthetics)
 2011 Sao Paulo Underground Tres Cabecas Loucuras (Cuneiform/Submarine)
 2013 Sao Paulo Underground Beija Flors Velho E Sujo (Cuneiform/Infinity Dogs)
 2016 Sao Paulo Underground Cantos Invisiveis (Cuneiform)

 as Isotope 217
 1998 Isotope 217 The Unstable Molecule (Thrill Jockey)
 1999 Isotope 217 Utonian Automatic (Thrill Jockey)
 2000 Isotope 217 Who Stole The I Walkman (Thrill Jockey)

 as Tigersmilk
 2003 Tigersmilk Tigersmilk (Family Vineyard)
 2005 Tigersmilk Tales From The Bottle (Family Vineyard)
 2007 Tigersmilk Android Love Cry (Family Vineyard)

 as Exploding Star Orchestra
 2007 Rob Mazurek's Exploding Star Orchestra We Are All from Somewhere Else (Thrill Jockey)
 2008 Rob Mazurek's Exploding Star Orchestra Bill Dixon with Exploding Star Orchestra   (Thrill Jockey)
 2010 Rob Mazurek's Exploding Star Orchestra Stars Have Shapes (Delmark)
 2013 Rob Mazurek's Exploding Star Orchestra Featuring Roscoe Mitchell + Solo Works Matter Anti-Matter (RogueArt)
 2013 Rob Mazurek Exploding Star Electro Acoustic Ensemble The Space Between (Delmark)
 2015 Rob Mazurek's Exploding Star Orchestra Galactic Parables: Volume 1 (Cuneiform)
 2020 Rob Mazurek's Exploding Star Orchestra Dimensional Stardust (International Anthem / Nonesuch Records)

 as solo and others
 1994 Rob Mazurek Quartet Man Facing East (Hep)
 1995 Rob Mazurek Quintet Badlands (Hep)
 1997 Rob Mazurek Quintet Green & Blue (Hep)
 1999 Orton Socket 99 Explosions (Moikai)
 2002 Rob Mazurek Amorphic Winged (Walking Road)
 2002 Rob Mazurek Silver Spines (Delmark)
 2003 Rob Mazurek/Liam Gillick Thought Farming (En/Of [Bottrop-Boy])
 2004 Rob Mazurek Music For Shattered Light Box and 7 Posters (Bottrop-Boy)
 2004 Rob Mazurek Sweet and Vicious Like Frankenstein (mego)
 2005 Mandarin Movie Mandarin Movie (Aesthetics Records)
 2008 Rob Mazurek Abstraction on Robert D'Arbrissel (Adluna)
 2009 Rob Mazurek Quintet Sound Is (Delmark)
 2009 Rohrer/Mazurek/Takara/Barely Projections of a Seven Foot Ghost (Peligro)
 2010 Rob Mazurek Calma Gente (Submarine)
 2011 Starlicker Double Demon (Delmark)
 2012 Rob Mazurek Pulsar Quartet Stellar Pulsations (Delmark)
 2012 Rob Mazurek/Carlos Issa Eclusa (Submarine)
 2013 Rob Mazurek Episodes (Wapapura)
 2013 Rob Mazurek Octet Skull Sessions (Cuneiform)
 2014 Rob Mazurek Mother Ode (Corbett vs Dempsey)
 2014 Rob Mazurek Alternate Moon Cycles Waning Crescent (International Anthem Recording Co.)
 2014 Rob Mazurek Black Cube SP Return the Tides: Ascension Suite and Holy Ghost (Cuneiform Records)
 2015 Rob Mazurek Vortice of the Faun (Astral Spirits)
 2016 Rob Mazurek and Emmett Kelly Alien Flower Sutra (International Anthem Recording Company)

References

External links
 Official website
 Rob Mazurek auf culturebase.net

1965 births
Living people
Hard bop trumpeters
Post-bop trumpeters
American jazz trumpeters
American male trumpeters
Musicians from Chicago
Musicians from Jersey City, New Jersey
Delmark Records artists
Avant-garde jazz trumpeters
American people of Polish descent
Isotope 217 members
21st-century trumpeters
Jazz musicians from Illinois
21st-century American male musicians
American male jazz musicians
RogueArt artists
Hep Records artists
Cuneiform Records artists